Western High School (WHS) is a public high school in Latham, Pike County in Southern Ohio.  It is the only high school in the Western Local School District.  Their nickname is the Indians and their school colors are green and white.

Athletics
The school's athletic affiliation is with the Ohio High School Athletic Association (OHSAA) and the Southern Ohio Conference (SOC), which has seventeen member schools and is divided into two divisions (SOC I & SOC II) based on the schools' enrollment. The SOC includes teams from four different Ohio counties - Jackson County (Oak Hill High School), Lawrence County (Saint Joseph Central High School and Symmes Valley High School), Pike County (Waverly High School, Eastern High School, and Western High School), and Scioto County (Clay High School, Green High School, Glenwood High School, Sciotoville Community School, Valley High School, Northwest High School, Minford High School, Portsmouth West High School, Notre Dame High School, South Webster High School, and Wheelersburg High School).

See also Ohio High School Athletic Conferences and the Southern Ohio Conference

References

External links
 Western Local School District

High schools in Pike County, Ohio
Public high schools in Ohio
Public middle schools in Ohio